Thomaz Bellucci and Guillermo Durán were the defending champions but chose not to defend their title.

Enzo Couacaud and Albano Olivetti won the title after defeating Íñigo Cervantes and Oriol Roca Batalla 4–6, 6–4, [10–2] in the final.

Seeds

Draw

References

External links
 Main draw

JC Ferrero Challenger Open - Doubles